The 2021 PSL season is the ninth season of the Philippine Super Liga (PSL).

Following the cancellation of the previous season due to the COVID-19 pandemic, three member teams took an indefinite leave of absence (Petron, Generika-Ayala and Marinerang Pilipina). This was followed by the transfer to the Premier Volleyball League (PVL) by the PLDT Group teams, PLDT Home Fibr and Cignal HD. The rival PVL also secured a three-year broadcast deal with Cignal TV, parent of the Cignal HD team.

The PSL resumed its games on February 26, 2021, with the staging of the 2021 Beach Volleyball Challenge Cup at the Subic Bay Free Port. After the beach tournament, the PSL intended to resume its indoor conferences for the 2021 season. However, in March 2021, the three remaining active member teams, Chery Tiggo, Sta. Lucia and F2 Logistics, announced their transfer to the PVL. On March 11, 2021, the PSL released a statement that it will still be active in sports development and maintained that the departure of its clubs to the PVL was done in amicable terms. The departure of all active teams rendered the planned staging of the All Filipino Conference in April 2021 unfeasible.

Beach volleyball

Women's

Playoffs:

Final standing:

Men's
No men's tournament.

References

Philippine Super Liga
PSL
PSL